Erika Giesen is a professional bodybuilder from Australia.

Bodybuilding career

Amateur
 1983: South Pacific - first place
 1983: Miss Asia - first place
 1984: Australian - first place
 1986: Australasia - first place

Professional
Giesen's greatest success was winning the first Ms. International contest in 1986.

Retirement
Giesen runs now a cattle station with her husband in Queensland Australia.

Legacy
Giesen was the first bodybuilder to win the Ms. International. She is currently the most successful Australian bodybuilder of all time.

Contest history
1984 World Amateur Championship - 2nd (LW)
1985 IFBB World Games - 4th (LW)
1986 Ms. International - 1st
1986 IFBB Ms. Olympia - 11th
1988 Ms. International - 6th

References

| colspan = 3 align = center | Ms. International
|-
| width = 30% align = center | Preceded by:-
| width = 40% align = center | First (1986)
| width = 30% align = center | Succeeded by:Cathey Palyo

Australian female bodybuilders
German emigrants to Australia
German female bodybuilders
Living people
People from Brisbane
Professional bodybuilders
Year of birth missing (living people)
German expatriate sportspeople in Australia